Fout is the surname of:

 Alison R. Fout, American inorganic chemist
 Frederick William Fout (1839 or 1840–1905), German-born Union Army officer in the American Civil War awarded the Medal of Honor
 Henry Harness Fout (1861–1947), American author and missionary
 Nina Fout (born 1959), American equestrian in the 2000 Olympics

See also
 Fouts, another surname